= Colbert Show =

Colbert Show may refer to one of the following TV programs hosted by Stephen Colbert:

- The Colbert Report, a satirical late-night talk and news show (2005–2014)
- The Late Show with Stephen Colbert, a late-night talk show (2015–2026)
